National Highway 344 (NH 344) is a  national highway in India running from Ambala in Haryana to Roorkee in Uttarakhand. It is a secondary route of National Highway 44.  NH-344 runs in the states of Haryana, Punjab, Uttar Pradesh and Uttarakhand in India.

Route 

The route of NH 344 transits four states of North India, namely Haryana, Punjab, Uttar Pradesh and Uttarakhand.

NH151 connects Ambala, Shahzadpur, Saha, Yamunanagar, Saharanpur and terminates at Roorkee.

Junctions  
 
  Terminal near Ambala.
  near Shahzadpur
  near Saha
  near Yamuna Nagar
  near Saharanpur
  near Chhutmalpur
  Terminal near Roorkee.

See also
 Highways in Haryana
 List of National Highways in India
 List of National Highways in India by state

References

External links 
 NH 344 on OpenStreetMap

National highways in India
National Highways in Haryana
National Highways in Punjab, India
National Highways in Uttar Pradesh
National Highways in Uttarakhand